Ercan Saatçi (b. 13 March 1968) is a Turkish musician and record producer. He was family origin the for Bayburt. Since the early 1990s, with the successful sales of his albums, he has been a prominent figure of Grup Vitamin, recognized in Turkey. 
He was known for being a member of "İzel-Çelik-Ercan", together with İzel and Çelik, which announced to make a come back in 2022. Saatçi owns "Rec by Saatchi", his own record label. Saatçi wrote columns at Hürriyet and Fanatik, football for Fenerbahçe SK.

Discography 
Source:

Albums 
 1991: Özledim (as İzel-Çelik-Ercan, feat. İzel and Çelik)
 1993: İşte Yeniden (as İzel-Ercan, feat. İzel)
 1995: Sayenizde
 1998: Manşet
 2003: Laila Orient

Singles 
 1996: Tam On Dört Saat Oldu
 2020: Kara Kışlar

Compilation albums 
 2001: Laila

References

External links 
 

1968 births
Acousticians
Living people
Anatolian rock musicians
Haydarpaşa High School alumni
Hürriyet people
Istanbul Technical University alumni
People from Eyüp
Percussionists
Psychedelic folk musicians
Turkish columnists
Turkish sports journalists
Turkish rappers
Turkish folk musicians
Turkish rock musicians
Turkish composers
Turkish film score composers
Turkish classical guitarists
Turkish drummers
Turkish keyboardists
Turkish classical violinists
Turkish mandolinists
Turkish hip hop musicians
Turkish folk-pop singers
Turkish electronic musicians
Turkish record producers
Turkish lyricists
Turkish music arrangers
Turkish male songwriters
20th-century violists
21st-century Turkish male musicians
20th-century Turkish male musicians